Cardinal Stakes may refer to:

 Cardinal Stakes (Great Britain), a flat horse race in Great Britain
 Cardinal Stakes (USA), a Thoroughbred horse race in the United States